is a Japanese food company.

It was a major dairy industry company established in 1917. Apart from dairy products like milk, ice cream, and cheese, their lineup includes sports drinks, pizza, chocolate bars and food supplements like "Toromeiku", described as a "food viscosity preparation".
It has a joint venture in Thailand with Charoen Pokphand to market dairy products.

On April 1, 2009, Meiji Seika and Meiji Dairies established a holding company, Meiji Holdings, which is a constituent of the Nikkei 225 index. Two years later on the day, Meiji Dairies took over the food and healthcare business of Meiji Seika, and became a food company with legal name Meiji Co., Ltd.

On December 6, 2011, radioactive caesium was found in the Meiji baby formula. The level of contamination was lower than the Japanese government's allowable limit of 200 becquerels per kilogram, which is 50 becquerels higher than the limit applied in the aftermath of the Chernobyl disaster. The company made the controversial claim that the infant milk was "within safety limits" and that it "didn't pose a health risk", despite a potentially large number of infants suffering internal radiation through ingesting the contaminated milk who were presumably already exposed to the external radiation originally unleashed in the March disaster. Meiji Dairies voluntarily recalled 400,000 cans of formula. The radioactive contamination was originally discovered by a citizen's group in Nihonmatsu City, Fukushima Prefecture as far back as November but the company found itself unable to act immediately upon receiving the information.

Meiji owns the United States cookie manufacturer D.F. Stauffer Biscuit Company based in York, Pennsylvania.

See also
Meiji Seika

Notes

External links

Meiji Co., Ltd. website in English

Japanese companies established in 1917
Food and drink companies established in 1917
Food and drink companies of Japan
Drink companies of Japan
Dairy products companies of Japan
Food and drink companies based in Tokyo
Japanese brands